Acer Studios is the personal project studio of the recording artist Tim Scott, located in Hazel Grove, Greater Manchester, England. It was established in November 2002.

Initially set up for the recording and release of Tim Scott's debut album Bald on the Inside in 2003, and as a front to administer the publishing and distribution rights of Tim Scott's solo compositions.

The favourable U.K. Guitar press reviews of Bald on the Inside gave opportunity for Scott to work alongside BBC Radio 1 DJ Judge Jules on the track "Puesta Del Sol" for Judge Jules debut artist album Proven Worldwide. While the initial idea was recorded at Jules studio in London, the final guitar tracks were subsequently re-recorded at Acer Studios.

The studio and the label interests were separated when the label name was changed to Acer Records, in order to separate the label and the underlying core company in 2008, by the release of Scott's second album Guitar Mashing.

Recording discography

Studio albums

EPs

Singles

Collaborative recording discography

Studio albums

Singles

References

External links
 Acer Studios

Recording studios in Greater Manchester
Music in Manchester
Organisations based in Stockport